The 2017 European Tour was the ninth edition of the Race to Dubai and the 46th season of golf tournaments since the European Tour officially began in 1972.

England's Tommy Fleetwood won the Race to Dubai. Spanish golfers collected the annual awards; Golfer of the Year was Sergio García, who won his first major, and Sir Henry Cotton Rookie of the Year was Jon Rahm

Changes for 2017
For the 2017 season, the European Tour created the "Rolex Series", a group of selected tournaments with a minimum purse of US$7 million. Seven tournaments were initially announced: the BMW PGA Championship, the Irish Open, the Scottish Open, the Italian Open and the three Final Series events – the Turkish Airlines Open, the Nedbank Golf Challenge and the DP World Tour Championship, Dubai. The Open de France was later announced as the eighth Rolex Series event.

There were changes to membership criteria with the creation of a new "Access List", a season-long money list excluding the Masters Tournament, PGA Championship, the four World Golf Championships and the Rolex Series events. The top three players in the Access List standings would be invited to play in Rolex Series events, and the top 10 players in the Access List final standings not otherwise exempt would gain full European Tour membership for the following season. There was a corresponding reduction in numbers from the Race to Dubai final standings gaining cards, down from the top 110 to the top 100.

Tournament changes 
New tournaments: GolfSixes.
Returning tournaments (not part of the 2016 season): Hong Kong Open, Sicilian Open, Andalucía Masters, Open de Portugal.
No longer part of the schedule: True Thailand Classic, King's Cup, AfrAsia Bank Mauritius Open (due to date change from May to December; returned for the 2018 season).
Format change: the Perth International became the World Super 6 Perth, with the top-24 players after 54-hole stroke play competing in a 6-hole knockout match play tournament on the final day.

Schedule
The following table lists official events during the 2017 season.

Unofficial events
The following events were sanctioned by the European Tour, but did not carry official money, nor were wins official.

Location of tournaments

Race to Dubai
Since 2009, the European Tour's money list has been known as the "Race to Dubai". It is based on money earned during the season, calculated in euro and converted into points (1 euro = 1 point). Earnings from tournaments awarding prize money in other currencies were converted at the exchange rate available the week of the event.

Final standings
Final top 10 players in the Race to Dubai:

• Did not play

Awards

Golfer of the Month

See also
2016 in golf
2017 in golf
2017 Challenge Tour
2017 European Senior Tour
2017 PGA Tour

Notes

References

2017
2017 in golf